Archery is an event at the Island Games, the biennial multi-sports event for island nations, territories and dependencies. There have been men's, women's and team events at almost every games since 1987. Modern competitive archery is governed by the World Archery Federation, abbreviated WA (formerly FITA - Fédération Internationale de Tir à l'Arc).

Recurve Individual 
 Men - 4 competitors per Island
 Women - 2 competitors per Island
Recurve Team - 1 team with up to 6 competitors per Island

Compound Individual 
 Men - 4 competitors per Island
 Women - 2 competitors per Island
Compound Team - 1 team with up to 6 competitors per Island

Minimum age 13 on day of opening ceremony.

Events
As of 2017 (archery was not contested at the 2019 Island Games).

Overall medal table

Single FITA recurve

Firing 144 arrows in total, being 3 dozen at each of 30m, 50m, 70m and 90m targets for men and 30m, 50m, 60m and 70m for women.

Top medalists

Results

Recurve knockout

Firing 12, 18 or 36 arrows.

Top medalists

Results

Recurve 720

Firing 72 arrows.

Single FITA compound

Firing 144 arrows in total, being 3 dozen at each of 30m, 50m, 70m and 90m targets for men and 30m, 50m, 60m and 70m for women.

Top Medalists

Results

Compound knockout

Firing 12, 18 or 36 arrows.

Top Medalists

Results

Compound 720

Firing 72 arrows.

Double FITA

Notes
 NGR in tables indicates New Games Record

References

 
Sports at the Island Games
Island Games